Gary O'Donoghue is a British journalist, currently working for BBC News in Washington, D.C. as their chief North America political correspondent. He is one of the most prominent blind correspondents in British media.

Early life
Gary O'Donoghue was born in 1969. His father was a semi-professional football player who also worked as a taxi driver, and his mother taught ballroom dancing. O'Donoghue was born partially sighted, but went totally blind by the time he was eight.

He was educated at Worcester College for the Blind (then a boys' boarding school though it has since merged with the similar girls' school), where he played blind football for England. O'Donoghue then attended Christ Church at Oxford University, where he read philosophy and modern languages.

Career
O'Donoghue undertook work experience at the BBC. He then joined the BBC on graduation from university, becoming a junior reporter on BBC Radio 4's Today programme; at one time, he was asked to bungee jump off Chelsea Bridge. During his career, he has covered stories for BBC News in Africa, Asia, Europe, and the U.S. In 2004, O'Donoghue became a political correspondent based at Westminster, reporting across the media of radio, television, and internet. From October 2011, O'Donoghue was the Chief Political Correspondent for BBC Radio 4 replacing Norman Smith, primarily reporting for the Today and PM programmes.

In 2007, he broke the story that new UK Prime Minister Gordon Brown was returning early from holiday to deal with an outbreak of foot-and-mouth disease in Surrey. However, BBC News at Ten deputy editor Daniel Pearl handed the story to June Kelly, which, in 2008, resulted in an out-of-court five-figure payment to O'Donoghue on grounds of disability discrimination.

At the 2014 BBC News Festival, it was revealed that O'Donoghue would be moving to Washington, D.C., as chief North America political correspondent for BBC News. Since then he has covered US politics, the presidency of Donald Trump and the presidency of Joe Biden. Between assignments, in summer 2014 he toured UK universities, telling journalism students about his time in the business.

Personal life 
O'Donoghue and his partner, Sarah Lewthwaite, have a home in Yorkshire, and one daughter.

References

External links

Interview with Disability Now!

Living people
English blind people
BBC newsreaders and journalists
English political commentators
Place of birth missing (living people)
British social commentators
People from Norfolk
Journalists from Yorkshire
1969 births